Joshua Douglas Morgan is a Canadian politician who has been serving as the 65th mayor of London since 2022. He was elected mayor in the 2022 London municipal election.

Early life
Joshua Douglas Morgan was born on March 23, 1978, in rural Ontario near a small town named Camlachie. He delivered the Sarnia Observer as a child and worked at TD Bank to pay his way through school. Morgan was the first in his family to go to university after first pursuing art at Sheridan College, and later deciding it wasn’t what he wanted to do.

He moved to London in 1998 to study economics and political science at the University of Western Ontario, receiving a combined honours BA in 2002. In 2004, he received an MA in political science (local government; Canadian government) from Western.

It was at Western University where Morgan met his future wife Melanie. They were married in 2007 in London, Ontario, and have four children together.

City council
Morgan’s first campaign for a seat on London City Council came in 2006. He lost to Ward 8 incumbent Paul Hubert by just 23 votes.

Morgan did not run in the 2010 municipal election, but did put his name on the ballot in 2014 seeking to represent Ward 7. This time, he was successful and won the seat by taking 56.56 per cent of the vote. During this term of council, Morgan was the mayor's appointed adviser on the 2016-2019 multi-year budget, London’s first multi-year budget.

Morgan was re-elected in 2018 as the Ward 7 city councillor by an even wider margin, winning 75.2 per cent of the vote.

During this term of council, Morgan was appointed budget chair, a role he occupied until 2021. He was also appointed deputy mayor by Mayor Ed Holder in 2020.

Mayoral campaign
Morgan filed his nomination papers to run for mayor of London on May 26, 2022, two days after Holder announced he would not seek re-election.

His platform focused on five key pillars: Housing & Affordability, Mental Health & Addictions, Inclusive City & Safe, Vibrant Neighbourhoods, Climate Change – A Greener London, and Economic Prosperity.

During the campaign, Morgan received a number of high-profile endorsements including those from Holder, London North Centre Liberal MP Peter Fragiskatos, London-Fanshawe New Democrat MP Lindsay Mathyssen, Elgin-Middlesex-London Conservative MP Karen Vecchio, and the London and District Labour Council.

Morgan was elected mayor on October 24, 2022, after having captured 65.72 per cent of the vote. Former Liberal MPP Khalil Ramal finished second with 22.59 per cent.

Mayoralty
Morgan was sworn in as London’s 65th mayor on November 15, 2022. He was given the investiture of the Mayor's Chain of Office by Ann Bigelow, the daughter of Jane Bigelow, London's first female mayor who served from 1972 to 1978. 

During the inaugural meeting of the 2022-26 City Council, Morgan nominated Ward 2 Councillor Shawn Lewis to serve as Deputy Mayor, and Ward 12 Councillor Elizabeth Peloza to serve as Budget Chair. Both appointments were for four years, and both appointments were approved unanimously by Council. 

Mayor Morgan delivered his first State of the City address on January 17th, 2023 before a crowd of approximately 1,300 people at RBC Place London. During his remarks, Mayor Morgan announced an anonymous family had donated $25-million to support a new health and homelessness system in London.

Electoral Record

2022 London Mayoral Election

2018 Municipal Election, Ward 7 City Council

2014 Municipal Election, Ward 7 City Council

2006 Municipal Election, Ward 8 City Council

References

Living people
Mayors of London, Ontario
21st-century Canadian politicians
1978 births